The 1992 Penn Quakers football team represented the University of Pennsylvania in the 1992 NCAA Division I-AA football season.

Schedule

References

Penn
Penn Quakers football seasons
Penn Quakers football